Claire Rhiannon Holt (born 11 June 1988) is an Australian actress. She is known for her roles as Emma Gilbert in H2O: Just Add Water,  Samara Cook in Pretty Little Liars, Chastity Meyer in Mean Girls 2, Rebekah Mikaelson in The Vampire Diaries, and its spinoff series The Originals and Legacies and Kate in the 2017 survival horror film, 47 Meters Down.

Early life
Holt was born in Brisbane to Geoffrey Holt and Ann. She has two sisters, Rachael (born in 1987) and Madeline (born in 1992), and one brother, David (born in 1989).

Career

2000s: Breakthrough and early recognition
In 2005, Holt won the role of Emma Gilbert in the Network Ten children's television show H2O: Just Add Water. The show has earned a Logie Award and Nickelodeon Australia Kids' Choice Award. While the series was renewed for a third season, Holt left the show after season two after signing on for the sequel to the 2007 film The Messengers, titled Messengers 2: The Scarecrow. She was replaced by Indiana Evans' character, Bella. Filming of Messengers 2 took place in Sofia throughout 2008. Starring alongside Norman Reedus and Heather Stephens, the film was released 21 July 2009 straight-to-DVD.

2010s: International recognition
In addition to television and film roles, Holt has appeared in advertisements for Dreamworld, Sizzler, and Queensland Lifesaving. BuddyTV ranked her number 55 on its TV's 100 Sexiest Women of 2011 list.

In August 2011, Holt was confirmed to be in the TV series The Vampire Diaries as Rebekah Mikaelson. On 13 January 2013, The CW announced that Holt had joined the cast for the backdoor pilot of The Vampire Diaries spin-off The Originals, where she reprised her role as Rebekah Mikaelson. She exited the show as a series regular in the sixteenth episode of the first season, which aired in the U.S. on 11 March 2014. Holt returned to her role in the season one finale on 13 May 2014, and continued to periodically guest star on the series until its finale on 1 August 2018.

In 2014, Holt was linked to CBS' Supergirl, though she chose not to pursue it. She starred in NBC "event series" Aquarius as Charmain Tully. In 2016, she was cast in the romantic comedy film The Divorce Party, playing the role of Susan.

Holt had a starring role, Kayla, in the ABC thriller drama television pilot Doomsday in 2017. Also that year, Holt starred as Kate in the underwater survival horror film 47 Meters Down, opposite Mandy Moore and Matthew Modine, which was released in theaters on 16 June 2017.

2020s: Established actress
In 2021, Holt had a starring role in Untitled Horror Movie. She also collaborated with the brand Andie Swim to design a swimsuit collection. In November of the same year, she appeared in the Originals spin-off series Legacies as Rebekah Mikaelson.

In 2022, Holt appeared again in Legacies as Rebekah Mikaelson for one episode, playing the character for the last time.

Personal life
In July 2015, Holt became engaged to long-time boyfriend, television producer Matt Kaplan. The two were married in April 2016. On 27 April 2017, Kaplan filed for divorce from Holt, citing "irreconcilable differences". Holt subsequently filed in response on 2 May 2017, also asking for her name to be changed from Kaplan back to Holt.

On 3 December 2017, Holt announced her engagement to real estate executive Andrew Joblon. On 5 March 2018, Holt revealed on Instagram that she had suffered a miscarriage. Holt and Joblon were married on 18 August 2018. On 11 October 2018, Holt announced on Instagram that she was pregnant, and revealed on 19 November that she was expecting a son. On 28 March 2019, she gave birth to a son. On 3 April 2020, Holt announced on Instagram that she was expecting her second child, and revealed on 16 April 2020 that she was expecting a girl. On 12 September 2020, Holt gave birth to a daughter.

Holt announced that she became an American citizen in November 2019.

Filmography

Awards and nominations

References

External links

1988 births
21st-century Australian actresses
Actresses from Brisbane
American people of Australian descent
American people of British descent
Australian child actresses
Australian expatriate actresses in the United States
Australian film actresses
Australian people of British descent
Australian television actresses
Living people